Barton and Broughton railway station served the villages of Barton and Broughton in Lancashire, England, from 1840 to 1965 on the Lancaster and Preston Junction Railway.

History 
The station opened as Broughton in November 1840 by the Lancaster and Preston Junction Railway. To the south were goods sidings and on the northbound platform was the station building. The station's name changed to Barton and Broughton in 1861. It closed to passengers on 1 May 1939 and to goods on 31 May 1965.

References

External links 

Disused railway stations in the City of Preston
Railway stations in Great Britain opened in 1840
Railway stations in Great Britain closed in 1939
1840 establishments in England
1965 disestablishments in England